"When a Man Lies" is a single by American R&B singer R. Kelly, and the third from his Love Letter sequel solo album Write Me Back, The song was both written and produced by Kelly himself. No official music video was made for this song.

Charts

References

2012 singles
R. Kelly songs
Songs written by R. Kelly
Song recordings produced by R. Kelly
Rhythm and blues songs
2012 songs
RCA Records singles